Arturo Salfran (born 21 September 1958) is a Cuban rower. He competed in the men's single sculls event at the 1980 Summer Olympics.

References

External links
 

1958 births
Living people
Cuban male rowers
Olympic rowers of Cuba
Rowers at the 1980 Summer Olympics
Place of birth missing (living people)
Pan American Games medalists in rowing
Pan American Games silver medalists for Cuba
Rowers at the 1983 Pan American Games